Sridhar is an Indian actor in the Kannada film industry, and also a dance scholar, performer and choreographer, trained in Bharatanatyam.  He also holds a degree in engineering.  Sridhar is married to Anuradha, also a Bharatanatyam dance performer; both have performed for many dance shows as a duo.

Film career
He entered Kannada cinema as a hero in the film Amrutha Ghalige, directed by Puttanna Kanagal. Since then he has acted in more than 60 films and has won many awards for his performances. He has acted in five languages- Kannada, Tamil, Telugu, Malayalam and Hindi.

Kannada
He won the Karnataka state government's Best Actor Award for his performance as the saint-poet Sharief, in the film Santa Shishunala Shariefa. This film also won the Nargis Dutt award from the Central Government. His film Bannada Vesha in Kannada won the regional best film award in which he portrayed the character of a Yakshagana artist. He also acted in many devotional films.

Tamil
K. Balachander gave him a big opening in the Tamil screen with his film Manathil Uruthi Vendum, (with Suhasini), eventhough he has also acted in   Aanpavam  a blockbuster hit of 1985, He later acted in several Tamil films, including Poo Pootta Nandavanam (with Sarita) and Maha Maayi (with Shobhana).

Telugu
His performance in a character role in the Telugu film Swarabhishekam, directed by K. Viswanath won high acclaim.  Shridhar became a household name in Andhra Pradesh with his outstanding performance as Lord Shiva in the classic Telugu serial Shivaleelalu on ETV Telugu.

Malayalam
He has acted in the highly acclaimed Malayalam film Manichitrathazhu directed by Fazil. This film won many State Awards and a National film award. He acted opposite Rudra as P. Mahadevan, a poet and professor.

Hindi
He acted as the hero in the Hindi film Bhairavi, directed by Arunaraje Patil. This film won a National award.

Notable filmography
Films

Serials
Shivaleelalu (ETV)
Thiruvilayadal (Sun TV)
Brindhavanam (Sun TV)

References

External links

Male actors in Kannada cinema
Living people
Male actors in Malayalam cinema
Indian male film actors
Male actors in Tamil cinema
Male actors in Hindi cinema
1960 births
20th-century Indian male actors
21st-century Indian male actors